Grund is a quarter in central Luxembourg City, in southern Luxembourg. It is located in the valley below the centre of Luxembourg City on the banks of the Alzette river. In addition to being a picturesque area, it is a popular nightlife precinct which can be accessed by foot or via a lift which descends through the cliff.

, the quarter has a relatively small population of 957 inhabitants, of whom 42.53% are Luxembourgers. Grund is home to Mosconi, a one-star Michelin restaurant which specialises in pasta.

Gallery

References

External links
 Homepage of the Syndicat du Stadtgrund (city quarter association)

Entertainment districts
Quarters of Luxembourg City